Guácimo is a canton in the Limón province of Costa Rica. The head city is in Guácimo district.

History 
Guácimo was created on 8 May 1971 by decree 4753.

Geography 
Guácimo has an area of  km² and a mean elevation of  metres.

The canton is landlocked and therefore the only canton in the province of Limón without access to the Caribbean Sea. Its northern border is marked by the Esperanza and Jiménez rivers, which also forms the western border. The Destierro and Parismina rivers delineate the eastern boundary, and the canton reaches into the Cordillera Central to the south.

Districts 
The canton of Guácimo is subdivided into the following districts:
 Guácimo
 Mercedes
 Pocora
 Río Jiménez
 Duacarí

Demographics 

For the 2011 census, Guácimo had a population of  inhabitants.

Transportation

Road transportation 
The canton is covered by the following road routes:

References 

Cantons of Limón Province
Populated places in Limón Province